Viktor Szilágyi (born 16 September 1978) is a retired Hungarian-born Austrian handball player for the Austria men's national handball team. He retired from professional handball in 2017. Currently, he is the sport director at THW Kiel.

His father, István Szilágyi is a Hungarian former handball player and current coach, while his brother Zoltán Szilágyi is the head coach of Debreceni VSC.

He was 6 years old when they moved to Austria and would eventually represent the nation as a part of the Austria national youth team, and the Austria national team.

References

1978 births
Living people
Austrian male handball players
Austrian people of Hungarian descent
Sportspeople from Budapest